St. Viator Church is a historic parish church of the Roman Catholic Archdiocese of Chicago located in the Old Irving Park neighborhood in Chicago, Illinois. The church is located at 4170 West Addison Street.

History

Founded in 1888 by the Clerics of Saint Viator who administered St. Viator College. The original parish was located on Belmont Avenue and Pulaski Road in Jefferson Township before the town was annexed by the city Chicago.

The Sisters of St. Joseph were invited to direct the parish's school in 1902. By 1904 the parish grew and it relocated to its current location on Addison Street and Kedvale Avenue. Groundbreaking for the current church building was in 1927 and in 1929 it was dedicated by Cardinal George Mundelein. Today, the parish grounds consists of the church, rectory, convent, recreation center, and St. Viator Elementary School which provides education for students pre-kindergarten through eighth grade.

Architecture
The church was designed by architect Charles L. Wallace in the English Gothic style.

Church in architecture books

See also
Clerics of Saint Viator

References

External links
 St. Viator Parish History

Roman Catholic churches in Chicago
Religious organizations established in 1888
Roman Catholic churches completed in 1929
Gothic Revival church buildings in Illinois
1888 establishments in Illinois